In mathematics, the Hahn polynomials are a family of orthogonal polynomials in the Askey scheme of hypergeometric orthogonal polynomials,  introduced by Pafnuty Chebyshev in 1875  and rediscovered by Wolfgang Hahn . The Hahn class is a name for special cases of Hahn polynomials, including Hahn polynomials, Meixner polynomials, Krawtchouk polynomials, and Charlier polynomials. Sometimes the Hahn class is taken to include limiting cases of these polynomials, in which case it also includes the classical orthogonal polynomials.

Hahn polynomials are  defined in terms of generalized hypergeometric functions by 

 give a detailed list of their properties.

If , these polynomials are identical to the discrete Chebyshev polynomials except for a scale factor.

Closely related polynomials include the dual Hahn polynomials Rn(x;γ,δ,N), the continuous Hahn polynomials pn(x,a,b), and the continuous dual Hahn polynomials Sn(x;a,b,c). These polynomials all have q-analogs with an extra parameter q, such as the q-Hahn polynomials Qn(x;α,β, N;q), and so on.

Orthogonality

  	

  		
where δx,y is the Kronecker delta function and the weight functions are
  	

  	
and
  	
.

Relation to other polynomials

Racah polynomials are a generalization of Hahn polynomials

References

Special hypergeometric functions
Orthogonal polynomials